Flatrock may refer to:

 Flatrock, Newfoundland and Labrador, Canada
 Flatrock Township, Henry County, Ohio, United States

See also

 Flat Rock (disambiguation)
 Flatrock Creek (disambiguation)
 Flatrock River